Karma Paljor is an Indian journalist and television news anchor. His career as a media professional began in 2001 and since then he's been associated with some famous news channel and last channel he was with is CNN-News18. He has received several awards for his role as a reporter and for his coverage of natural disasters since then. He co-founded Atvi Infotainment, a content creation company in 2018. The business verticals include EastMojo.com and Atvi Studios.

Early life and education

After attending school in Tashi Namgyal Academy, at his birthplace Sikkim, India, Karma Paljor headed for graduation from Bangalore University and then post-graduation diploma from Xavier Institute of Communication, Mumbai.

Career

Karma started his career with The Times of India in Mumbai and moved to CNBC TV18 in 2001. Apart from covering national and political stories for the channel, Paljor also anchored the breakfast show on CNBC TV18. He won the Chevening Scholarship for Broadcast journalism in 2004. He joined CNN-IBN in 2005 as a founding employee and has hosted every possible show on the channel. He specializes in covering aviation and natural disaster. He has planned and executed several award-winning programs like Budget Yatra, Axe the Tax, and Reporters Project. Some of his other shows were Cash Crisis Yatra, Interview with Jeff Bezos, India @9, Big 5 @10. He also headed the special features team.

Awards and honors

Karma was awarded the reporter of the year in 2010 by Indian Television at the News Television Awards. In 2011, he won the prestigious Ramnath Goenka Award for excellence in Journalism in the category for Business and Economic Journalism. His teams coverage of the 2013 North India floods in Uttrakhand, and won the award for the Best National News Coverage in English at the Exchange4media News Broadcasting Awards (ENBA) in 2013. In 2014, Karma won the ENBA Award in the Best Spot News Reporting (English) category for his coverage of Cyclone Phailin, which won him the Ramnath Goenka Excellence in Journalism Award for on-the-spot reporting in 2014.

References

Sources

External links
 

Indian male television journalists
CNN people
Bangalore University alumni
journalist
Year of birth missing (living people)
Living people
Indian television news anchors
Indian television talk show hosts
Indian male journalists
Indian political journalists
20th-century Indian journalists